The Vacant Lots are an American post-punk electro band based in Brooklyn, New York.

History 

The Vacant Lots are a two-piece post-punk electro band formed by Jared Artaud and Brian MacFadyen in Burlington, Vermont. The group is now based out of New York City. Their sound has been described as minimalist, rock and roll, psych and punk. The band's "minimal means maximum effect" aesthetic is something they have developed since the band's formation by continuing as a two-piece. The group has cited Native American drumming, Indian tanpura, early rock n roll, The Gun Club, and Television as major influences on their sound.

In 2010, the duo were invited by Sonic Boom of legendary UK psych band Spacemen 3 and EAR to tour the U.S. for the first time with his band Spectrum. In 2011, The Vacant Lots signed to Mexican Summer and released their first official single "Confusion" b/w "Cadillac." Later that year, The Black Angels and The Reverberation Appreciation Society invited The Vacant Lots to perform at Austin Psych Fest 4. In the summer of 2011, The Vacant Lots supported Dean Wareham (Galaxie 500, Luna, Dean & Britta) for one of the last performances of Dean Wareham Plays Galaxie 500 Songs at The Bell House in New York City. In 2012, they were invited back to play Austin Psych Fest 5 and the band signed to Austin Psych Fest's record label, The Reverberation Appreciation Society, for their second official 7" single release, "High And Low" b/w "Let Me Out."

In January 2013, The Vacant Lots toured the U.S. with The Growlers. In February, the duo's third single "6 AM" was released on Sonic Cathedral Records (UK), as part of a 6 band contemporary psych-rock compilation called Psych For Sore Eyes, mastered by Sonic Boom. In October 2013, The Vacant Lots' cover version of "No More Christmas Blues" by Alan Vega of Suicide was released on Cleopatra Records as part of a compilation album called Psych-Out Christmas that featured Iggy Pop, Psychic Ills, Dead Meadow, The Fuzztones and more.

In February 2014, Jared Artaud released a book of poetry called Empty Space that was published by Dactyl Poetry. The Vacant Lots have also announced that they have completed their debut album, which will be released in the summer of 2014. In April 2014, the two-piece supported indie-rock icon and label-mate Dean Wareham on a tour of the U.S.

The Vacant Lots announced their debut album 'Departure' would be released on UK independent record label Sonic Cathedral on July 1, 2014. 'Departure' was produced by The Vacant Lots, mixed and mastered by Sonic Boom and features Dean Wareham on guitar. BrooklynVegan premiered the first single and music video for  "Mad Mary Jones" from the debut album. On May 21, 2014, The Vacant Lots and Alan Vega of influential New York punk band Suicide released a split 10" vinyl on Fuzz Club Records. The release debuts a new track by Alan Vega entitled "Nike Soldier" and an alternate mix of "Mad Mary Jones" by The Vacant Lots. In the same week, Interview Magazine premiered the music video for "Before The Evening's Thru", which is the second released track from the band's upcoming debut album 'Departure'.

In June and July 2014, The Vacant Lots toured the UK for the first time with legendary neo-psych band The Brian Jonestown Massacre. On July 1, The Vacant Lots released their debut album 'Departure' on London independent label Sonic Cathedral. In September, Spanish independent label Ayo Silver! released a limited edition 10" vinyl entitled 'Arrival' compiling the band's singles and remixes. 'Arrival' was also included as a bonus disc in the first initial copies of the group's debut album and features artwork by LA Pop-Surrealist artist Anthony Ausgang. Additionally, in September the band toured Europe and the UK as well as a performance at Liverpool Psych Fest. On September 22, Sonic Cathedral released the duo's third single "Paint This City" backed with "Departure." The Quietus premiered the music video for the single, which was directed by Boston filmmaker Samuel Quinn.

The Vacant Lots supported 1970s electro-punk legends Suicide at Webster Hall in New York City on March 7, 2015. On March 16, 2015, Sonic Cathedral released a vinyl only single by The Vacant Lots that featured two remixes by Alan Vega of Suicide and Anton Newcombe of The Brian Jonestown Massacre. The Vacant Lots performed at acclaimed independent UK music festival Secret Garden Party with Temples and Toy on July 25, 2015.

During their 2015 European tour, The Vacant Lots recorded a collaborative EP entitled 'Berlin' with Anton Newcombe of The Brian Jonestown Massacre in Berlin, Germany that was released on Anton Newcombe's record label A Recordings on November 25, 2016.

The band's second full-length album, 'Endless Night', was released worldwide on Metropolis Records on April 21, 2017. The last track on the album "Suicide Note" featured vocals by Alan Vega of the legendary punk band Suicide. It is one of the final collaborations that Alan Vega was part of before he died on July 16, 2016.  The Vacant Lots supported influential rock band Black Rebel Motorcycle Club in Europe in 2017.

In May, 2019 The Vacant Lots were invited by legendary Portland rock band The Dandy Warhols to tour the U.S. on their 25th anniversary tour.

On August 30, 2019, the group released 'Exit' on A Recordings, which is their second EP recorded with Anton Newcombe of The Brian Jonestown Massacre who mixed & produced the album in Berlin. 
"Bells" the single off the record charted at number 9 on the Official UK Vinyl Singles Chart Top 40.

On Friday, April 24, 2020, The Vacant Lots announced their third album 'Interzone' will be released on June 26 on London indie record label Fuzz Club. The album is described as "a genre-blending synthesis of dance and psych" The album sleeve and packaging features the consistent visual identity associated with the band; black and white Op artwork by Swiss designer, Ivan Liechti. On April 24, "Rescue", the first single off the new album was released and described by Brooklyn Vegan as "post-punk inspired...which brings to mind Jesus and Mary Chain and Love & Rockets." 
"Fracture", the second single off the group's third album "Interzone" was released on May 22, and premiered on Post Punk Magazine, which they described as "explosive psych mixed with the experimental spirit of proto-punk; a fuzzy memory trying desperately to resurface." On Friday, June 26, 2020, The Vacant Lots third album "Interzone" was released on London's record label Fuzz Club. The album features a music video for 'Party's Over' directed by British film-maker and video artist Browzan.

On October 16, 2020, Fuzz Club released The Vacant Lots' "Departure" Remix by Robert Levon Been of Black Rebel Motorcycle Club who's been a longtime supporter of the band.
On October 30, A Recordings released The Vacant Lots' "Damage Control" which is a double album featuring both Berlin and Exit EP that was recorded and produced by Anton Newcombe of The Brian Jonestown Massacre at his studio in Berlin. In 2021, Jared Artaud co-produced, mixed, and did art direction on the lost Alan Vega album entitled "Mutator" released on Sacred Bones Records.

The Vacant Lots announced their fourth album entitled "Closure" is to be released on September 30, 2022, on Fuzz Club. The single "Thank You" off the album premiered on Flood Magazine on August 8, 2022. "Thank You" also aired on Punk icon Iggy Pop's Iggy Confidential BBC6 radio show titled "Iggy Confidential with some brand new Vacant Lots" on February 2, 2022. The Vacant Lots released their third single "Consolation Prize" on September 7, 2022, from their upcoming album "Closure". The song and music video premiered on Under The Radar Magazine. "Consolation Prize" first aired on Iggy Pop's Iggy Confidential BBC6 radio show titled "Iggy Confidential with some brand new Vacant Lots". On September 30, The Vacant Lots supported psych-rock pioneers The Black Angels in North America culminating in a performance at Levitation (festival) for the official after party for legendary rock band The Jesus and Mary Chain.

Band members

Members
Jared Artaud — Vocals, Guitars, Bass, Synths, Producer, Mixing, Songwriter.
Brian MacFadyen — Electronics, Drums, Vocals, Bass, Synths, Producer, Mixing, Songwriter.

Discography

Albums
  Closure (Sept 2022) (Fuzz Club)
  Interzone (June 2020) (Fuzz Club)
  Endless Night (April 2017) (Metropolis)
  Departure (July 2014) (Sonic Cathedral)

EPs
   Exit (EP 12") (August 2019) (A Recordings)
   Berlin (EP 12") (November 2016) (A Recordings)
  Alan Vega/The Vacant Lots (EP  split 10") (May 2014) (Fuzz Club)

Singles

  "Consolation Prize" (Digital) (Sept 2022) (Fuzz Club)
  "Thank You" (Digital) (Aug 2022) (Fuzz Club)
  "Chase" (Digital) (Aug 2022) (Fuzz Club)
  "Departure" (Robert Levon Been Remix) (7", Digital) (October 2020) (Fuzz Club)
  "Exit" (Digital) (June 2020) (Fuzz Club)
  "Fracture" (Digital) (May 2020) (Fuzz Club)
  "Rescue" (Digital) (April 2020) (Fuzz Club)
  "Bells" (Digital) (May 2019) (A Recordings)
  "Departure" / "Let Me Out" (Sonic Boom Mix) (7") (April 2015) (Bronson Recordings)
  "6 AM" (Alan Vega Remix) / "Never Satisfied" (Anton Newcombe Remix) (7") (March 2015) (Sonic Cathedral)
  "Paint This City" / "Departure" (Digital) (September 2014) (Sonic Cathedral)
  "Before The Evening's Thru" (Digital) (July 2014) (Sonic Cathedral)
  "Mad Mary Jones" (Digital) (June 2014) (Sonic Cathedral)
  "High and Low" / "Let Me Out" (7") (August 2012) (The Reverberation Appreciation Society)
  "Confusion" / "Cadillac" (7") (January 2011) (Mexican Summer)

Compilations

  Damage Control (LP) (October 2020) (A Recordings)
  "6 AM" (LP) Liverpool International Festival Of Psychedelia Presents PZYK Vol. 1 (October 2020) (PZYK Records)
  "Fame" (LP) A Salute To The Thin White Duke - The Songs of David Bowie (October 2016) (Cleopatra Records)
  "Julia" (LP) The Magical Mystery Psych-Out: A Tribute To The Beatles (March 2015) (Cleopatra Records)
  "She Smiled Sweetly" (LP) Stoned: A Psych Tribute to The Rolling Stones (January 2015) (Cleopatra Records)
  "No More Christmas Blues" (LP) Psych-Out Christmas (October 2013) (Cleopatra Records)
  "6 AM" (EP) Psych For Sore Eyes (February 2013) (Sonic Cathedral)

Logo

The Vacant Lots logo is a black spiral with the band name juxtaposed through and then around the outer layer or ring.  Like most of the band's album artwork, concert posters and visual aesthetic, the colors black and white are used to create the logo. The design of the band's logo was created by The Vacant Lots.

References

External links
 Official site

American indie rock groups
Psychedelic rock music groups from New York (state)
Musical groups from New York City
American post-punk music groups
American experimental musicians
American performance artists
Mexican Summer artists